The Hellerman Rocks are a group of seven small islets and rocks connected by a shoal, located  east of Hermit Island, off the southwest coast of Anvers Island, Antarctica. It was named by the Advisory Committee on Antarctic Names for Lieutenant Lance W. Hellerman of the U.S. Navy Reserve, Officer-in-Charge of Palmer Station in 1969.

References

Rock formations of the Palmer Archipelago